The Hoher Gjaidstein is a 2,794 m high mountain peak in the Dachstein Mountains in Upper Austria east and above the Hallstätter Glacier. It may be reached from the summit station of the Dachstein South Face Cable Car or from the Simony Hut each of which is an easy grade I climb. As well as the Hoher Gjaidstein (="Higher Gjaidstein") there is also the Niederen Gjaidstein ("Lower Gjaidstein", 2,482 m) and the Kleinen Gjaidstein ("Little Gjaidstein", 2,734 m).

The mountain was climbed as early as 1823 by de Halley from the north from the Gjaid cirque (Gjaidkar). Whether the actual summit had been conquered earlier is not known.

Sources 

 Willi End: Alpenvereinsführer Dachsteingebirge Ost. Bergverlag Rudolf Rother, Munich 1980. . Randzahlen 1061 – 1079

Dachstein Mountains
Mountains of the Alps
Mountains of Upper Austria
Two-thousanders of Austria